The 1994 British League Division Three was the third tier/division of British speedway. It was also the final season of the British League before a restructure of the sport.

Summary
The title was won by Berwick Bandits. The Iwade Kent Crusaders withdrew from the league.

Final league table

Iwade Kent Crusaders withdrew.

Teams and averages
Berwick

Glyn Taylor 9.79
David Nagel 8.50
Michael Lowrie 8.50
William Beveridge 8.27
Anthony Barlow 8.20
Kevin Little 8.13
Gareth Martin 7.66
David Meldrum 2.67

Buxton

Dean Felton 7.71
Richard Webb 6.42
Lee Dicken 6.13
Jamie Isherwood 4.84
Scott Donovan 4.48
Carl Checketts 4.44
Shawn Venables 4.36
Sean Naylor 3.50
Steve Mitchell 1.60
Steve Crockett 1.14

Cleveland

Colin Earl 10.31
Jason Handley 9.67
Andy Howe 8.28
Peter Johnson 7.20
Jonathan Swales 6.38
Brian Turner 4.36
Tony Howe 3.87

Iwade (withdrew from league)

Kevin Teager 7.20
Jason Green 5.33
Dean Chapman 5.00
Mark Fordham 4.00
Nathan Gaymer 4.00
David Mason 3.20

Linlithgow

Geoff Powell 9.40
Paul Gould 8.72
Peter Scully 6.50
Brian Mercer 6.33
Grant Blackie 6.22
Stuart Coleman 5.45
Neil Hewitt 5.21
Paul Taylor 2.92

Mildenhall

Simon Wolstenholme 9.03
Gary Sweet 6.98
Peter Boast 6.00
Martin Cobbin 5.84
Dean Garrod 5.82
Steve Battle 5.18
Tony Kingsbury 5.09
Carl Johnson 4.69
Sid Cooper 2.75

Stoke

Chris Cobby 10.40
Andre Compton 8.13
Craig Taylor 7.41
Ade Hoole 7.35
Colin Thorpe 6.88
Gary O'Hare 5.85
Scott Kirton 5.14
Rob Horner 5.09
Paul Macklin 2.75
Drew Wheeldon 2.74

See also
List of United Kingdom Speedway League Champions
Knockout Cup (speedway)

References

British League (Div 3)
Speedway British League (Div 3)